Germaine Reuver (1885–1953) was a French stage and film actress.

Selected filmography
 Miss Helyett (1933)
 Lake of Ladies (1934)
 Inspector of the Red Cars (1935)
 Madame Angot's Daughter (1935)
 Caprices (1941)
 The Inevitable Monsieur Dubois (1943)
 Mademoiselle Has Fun (1948)
 Millionaires for One Day (1949)
 The Prize (1950)
 Darling Caroline (1951)
 Shadow and Light (1951)
 Mr. Peek-a-Boo (1951)
 Alone in Paris (1951)
 La Poison (1951)
 The Red Head (1952)
 It Happened in Paris (1952)
 Companions of the Night (1953)
 The Father of the Girl (1953)

References

Bibliography
 Goble, Alan. The Complete Index to Literary Sources in Film. Walter de Gruyter, 1999.

External links

1885 births
1953 deaths
French film actresses
French silent film actresses
20th-century French actresses
French stage actresses
Actresses from Paris